Citybois is a Danish pop music duo from Gentofte, Denmark. The band was formed by Anthon Edwards Knudtzon & Thor Blanchez Farlov to compete in the eight season of the Danish version of the X Factor. They were eliminated in the semi-final, coming in 4th place after they received the fewest votes from the Danish public. They have released two studio album's, "What Bois About To", and "BOIS FOREVER".

Performances during X Factor

Discography

Albums

EPs
 What Bois About To (2015)

Singles

References

External links

Danish musical duos
X Factor (Danish TV series) contestants